Kaileuna is an island in the Trobriand Islands group of Papua New Guinea. With an area of 45.53 km², it is the second-largest island in the group, after Kiriwina.

As of the census of the population of 2000, there were 1,908 people living on the island, in five villages:
Kaduwaga (645)
Kaisiga (409)
Tawema (352)
Koma (282)
Giva (220)

The largest village, Kaduwaga, is on the north-west coast of the island.

Between Bulakwa and Kaisiga villages, two small villages, Musa and Kapisila, have been established. Kapisila was established by a few families from Bulakwa village  and Musa village is when a few families migrated from Kaisiga village. However, all the villages in the South of Kaileuna Island are referred to as 'Kaisiga'.
In 2015 a Primary School was established at Kaisiga village. There are now three main schools in Kaileuna - Kaileuna Primary School at Kaduwaga, Kaisiga primary School at Kaisiga and Kuyawa Primary School at Kuyawa Island.

The two main Christian Denominations at Kaileuna are United Church and Seventh-Day Adventists (SDA). Except for Kaisiga villages (Kaisiga, Bulakwa, Kapisila and Musa) rest of the Kaileuna Island villages are United Church. The United churches at Kaileuna Island are referred to as Kaileuna Circuit of Kiriwina United Church.

References

Kaileuna at WikiMapia

Literature 
Gunter Senft: Landscape terms and place names in the Trobriand Islands – the Kaile’una subset. In: Language Sciences 30 (2008) 340–361 (online)

Trobriand Islands
Islands of Milne Bay Province